HDL may refer to one of the following:

 Hardware description language
 Handle System identifier (Hdl.handle.net)
 Headstone Lane railway station, London, National Rail station code
 High-density lipoprotein
 Les Hurlements d'Léo, an alternative rock band from France
 GE HDL diesel engine
 HDL System, HDL Universal Tactical role-playing game system produced by Tremorworks, LLC
 Huntington's disease-like syndromes, a family of genetic neurological diseases
 Huey, Dewey and Louie, Donald Duck's nephews